is a Japanese voice actress affiliated with the talent agency Crocodile. She began her career in 2012, after passing an audition for the role of Mirai Higashiura in Chita Musume., a multimedia project created to promote Chita Peninsula. Kozakai is also the Tourism Ambassador of Higashiura, a member of idol unit Guil Drops, and a ring announcer for World Wonder Ring Stardom. 

Her notable roles in anime include Pekola in Dropkick on My Devil!, Yuki Yoshikawa in Horimiya, and Ichika Arima in Koikimo.

Biography

Early life
Kozakai was born in Higashiura on July 6, 1995. Having been interested in music since childhood, she took piano lessons at an early age and later became interested in anime when she was in elementary school, influenced by children in her neighborhood. During this time, she played flute in a marching band and was a member of a track and field team. She started to play guitar due to her admiration for musician Yui and was aspired to become a voice actress after watching Bleach. While in high school, she joined a light music club, stating that she wanted to carry a guitar to her school.

Career
Her career as a voice actress began in 2012 at the age of 16, after passing an audition for the role of Mirai Higashiura in the multimedia project Chita Musume., which produced a series of anime shorts to promote her hometown. She and her fellow actresses won Best Performance Group Award at Taipei International Travel Fair for three consecutive years for their roles in the project. She was appointed the Tourism Ambassador of Higashiura in 2014, and joined the talent agency Crocodile in 2017.

She played her first major role as Pekola in the 2018 anime television series Dropkick on My Devil!, which she also performed the series' opening theme , along with her co-stars. The same year, Kozakai became a member of the voice actress idol unit Guil Drops, created by Riho Iida as part of BS Fuji's television program Japacon Project, titled Guild Friends ~Iida Riho no ! Sekai e? Honki Desu!, and started to work as a ring announcer for World Wonder Ring Stardom. She graduated from college in March 2019, and received her first lead role as Ichika Arima in the 2021 anime series Koikimo. In February 2023, Kozakai was featured in the magazine Weekly Playboy as a gravure model.

Filmography

Anime

Video games

References

External links
 Official agency profile 
 Official announcer profile 
 

1995 births
Japanese voice actresses
Living people
Sports commentators
Voice actresses from Aichi Prefecture